The Faroe pony, Faeroes pony, or Faroese horse, (Føroyska rossið in Faroese) is a small pony, with a height between . Technically this animal is a pony due to its height, but in the Faroe Islands it is called a horse because of its strength. The Faroe pony is only to be seen on the Faroe Islands and is therefore little known in other countries. There are only 94 Faroe ponies left living on the Faroe Islands.

Features 
The colors of the pony vary a lot, but are mainly chestnut, brown, black or speckled, with white also occurring in previous populations. It is known to be very an enduring, strong, friendly, adaptable and sure-footed pony breed with four gaits including the tölt, an ambling gait which it shares with the Icelandic horse. A fully grown Faroese pony weighs 250-300 kilograms. The winter coat is very long, dense and water repellent, while the summer coat is shorthaired and smooth.

History

The Faroese pony is mentioned in written sources from the 1600s. In the old days this pony breed was used to carry or haul heavy loads at farms and some sources also describes Faroese ponies trained to herd sheep (known as tøkuhestar). When it wasn't at work, it was released onto the mountains where it roamed freely. Today Faroese ponies are only kept by hobby breeders and it is mostly used as a riding horse for children.

The Faroe pony has been on the Faroe Islands for many hundreds of years. In 1880 more than 800 animals were registered on the Faroe Islands, but by the 1960s the population had been decimated to only five to six horses. One of the reasons was an extensive horse export from 1850 - 1920, for use in the mining industry (as pit ponies) in the United Kingdom. A conservation and breeding program was initiated by Leivur T. Hansen and in 1978 the organization Felagið Føroysk Ross (Breeders of Faroe Ponies) was established. With huge efforts, the Faroe pony population increased to 70 animals in 2015 which are declared genetically pure, with 14 male breeders and the aim is to maintain and develop the breed further. The low population is a risk for inbreeding, and approval for export may improve genetic diversity.

The Faroe pony has since been recognised as a unique breed.

See also
  Fjord horse
  Nordlandshest/Lyngshest
Icelandic horse
Faroe Islands domestic animals

References

Sources 
 NordGen: Føroyska rossið (Færø hesten) Faroese Veterinary Service 
 Faroese Horse Society for Faroese Horses

External links

Felagið Føroysk Ross Breeders of Faroe Ponies 
Breeds of Livestock - Faeroes Pony Horse Department of Animal Science at Oklahoma State University
Faroese pony stamps

Horse breeds
Faroese culture
Horse breeds originating in Denmark